Ron Jans (born 29 September 1958) is a Dutch football coach and former player, he currently is the head coach of Twente.

Coaching career

FC Groningen
Born in Zwolle, Overijssel, Ron Jans joined FC Groningen on 2002, and was the longest-serving head coach in the whole Eredivisie, being instrumental in the club's recent successes, including two consecutive UEFA Cup qualifications in 2005 and 2006. During his time at Groningen, Jans was known for his witty comments during press conferences and his positive attitude towards the press. He was formerly active as a German language teacher. He also appeared regularly in the Dutch television channel Nederland 3 as a UEFA Champions League analyst for the 2009–10 season.

In November 2009 he announced he will leave FC Groningen at the end of the 2009–10 season, after eight years in charge of the club, citing his desire for a new experience as the main reason behind his choice.

SC Heerenveen
In February 2010 SC Heerenveen officials agreed terms with the Groningen coach for next season, the 51-year-old joined his new club at the end of the season to replace Jan de Jonge. The move was quite a controversy as SC Heerenveen and FC Groningen are great rivals in the Dutch Eredivisie. Ron Jans was seen as a Groningen FC ace and the supporters did not think much of his step to the rivals. After the news came out, the fans showed a banner saying, "You never knew how to replace someone." With this message they showed their dislike of the move of the manager on the one hand and sneered at how he sometimes substituted players that hardly made any sense.

Jans' first season in charge of Heerenveen was mostly considered as disappointing, as he only managed to achieve an unimpressive twelfth place in the league table and was also criticized due to a number of controversial choices. His second season turned out however to be much better, thanks to his ability to get the most out of forwards Bas Dost, Luciano Narsingh, and Oussama Assaidi and drive the team into the battle for the league title by April 2012. In January 2012, it was revealed Ron Jans would depart from Heerenveen by the end of the season, with former Dutch superstar player Marco van Basten taking over from him. He led Heerenveen to direct UEFA Europa League qualification by the end of the season.

Standard Liège
He signed to Standard Liège on 29 May 2012, but agreed with the club to end his contract on 22 October after Standard was at that time 12th in the Belgian Pro League.

PEC Zwolle
Jans joined PEC Zwolle in 2013. In his first season, he won the KNVB Cup after beating AFC Ajax 5–1 in the final. In the 2014–15 season he led PEC Zwolle to the cup final once again and also winning the Johan Cruijff Schaal.

FC Cincinnati
On 26 July 2019, The Athletic reported that Jans had been hired as the head coach of American club FC Cincinnati, and would replace interim coach Yoann Damet as soon as he obtained a work visa. FC Cincinnati officially announced the hiring on 5 August 2019, ending a months-long coach search that began with their firing of Alan Koch in May 2019. This was Jans' second time working with FC Cincinnati general manager Gerard Nijkamp, who had hired Jans in 2013 when he was technical director of PEC Zwolle. Jans' contract was set to expire on 31 December 2020, with Nijkamp having previously indicated that their coach hire would be a "short-term solution" to be re-evaluated ahead of the 2021 season.

On 17 February 2020 Jans resigned from his head coach position at FC Cincinnati amidst an investigation into his alleged use of a racial slur.

FC Twente
Jans is currently manager of FC Twente.

Managerial statistics

Honours

Manager
PEC Zwolle
KNVB Cup: 2013–14
Johan Cruyff Shield: 2014

References

External links
 Profile 

1958 births
Living people
Sportspeople from Zwolle
Association football forwards
Dutch footballers
Dutch expatriate footballers
Dutch football managers
Dutch expatriate football managers
Dutch schoolteachers
PEC Zwolle players
FC Groningen players
Roda JC Kerkrade players
SC Veendam players
Eredivisie players
Eerste Divisie players
Sanfrecce Hiroshima players
Japan Soccer League players
Expatriate footballers in Japan
Dutch expatriate sportspeople in Japan
Eredivisie managers
FC Groningen managers
Standard Liège managers
Footballers from Overijssel